Mr Emmet Takes a Walk is a chamber opera by the English composer Sir Peter Maxwell Davies with a libretto by David Pountney. The work is self-described as a "dramatic sonata".

It tells the story of the last seconds of the life of Mr Emmet before his suicide on a railway line. Thoughts, ideas, musical fragments and experiences flash through Mr Emmet's mind before his death which expand across the fifty-minute duration of the work.

Davies has cited the works of four composers as motifs in the opera: 
Bach's Prelude and Fugue No. 12 in F minor (BWV, 881) from Book 2 of the Well-Tempered Clavier 
Andrea Gabrieli's Edipo Tiranno 
"Come furia disperata" from Mozart's Don Giovanni (sung by the character Donna Anna in act 1, scene 1), 
the opening of Schumann's Second Symphony.

The work premiered in a co-production of Muziektheater Transparant and the Psappha ensemble at the St. Magnus Festival, Orkney on 16 June 2000. It was recorded in 2005 with the original cast.

Although Davies intimated that Mr Emmet Takes a Walk would be his last piece of musical theatre, just over a decade later he completed the a further opera, Kommilitonen!.

Roles

Sections
Exposition — A premonition
No. 1 Introduction
No. 2 Duet
No. 3 Arioso
No. 4 Cabaletta
No. 5 Trio

Development — Encounters
Episode 1 The Piano
Interlude 1
Episode 2 The Park
Interlude 2
Episode 3 The Hotel Room
Interlude 3
Episode 4 The Mountain
Interlude 4
Episode 5 The Teacher
The Torch Song
Interlude 5
Recapitulation - A monologue
Coda

References

External links
Details at Boosey & Hawkes
Notes on the work (Psappha)]
Production details at Muziektheater Transparant

2000 operas
English-language operas
Operas
Operas by Peter Maxwell Davies
Chamber operas